The nasolabial lymph node is a facial node found near the nose and upper lip.

References 

Lymphatics of the head and neck